Køge station is the principal railway station in Køge near Copenhagen, Denmark. It is the terminus of an S-train line (Køgebugtbanen) that connects it to Copenhagen. It is also served by Østbanen for trains to Stevns and Roskilde and by Lille Syd to Næstved. In April 2023, DSB will start operating regional trains on the Næstved–Køge–Copenhagen route via the high speed Copenhagen–Køge Nord Line.

A fountain, created by the Swedish-born artist Pontus Kjerrman in 1993, located on the small square in front of the station, represents the "catwoman" and the "horseman".

See also
 List of railway stations in Denmark

References

External links

Køge Municipality
S-train (Copenhagen) stations
Railway stations in Region Zealand
Railway stations opened in 1870
Railway stations in Denmark opened in the 19th century